The A429 is a main road in England that runs in a north-northeasterly direction from junction 17 of the M4 motorway ( north of Chippenham in Wiltshire) to Coventry in the West Midlands.

Route 
For much of its length, the A429 follows the route of the Roman Fosse Way.
It links the M4 in Wiltshire to Coventry in the West Midlands, by way of Malmesbury (bypassed), Crudwell, Cirencester, Stow-on-the-Wold, Moreton-in-Marsh, east of Stratford-upon-Avon, Warwick, and Kenilworth.

History 
When first designated in 1922, the A429 ran from Chippenham to Warwick.

In the 1970s the route was extended from Warwick to Coventry on the old route of the A46.

In the 1990s the dual carriageway between Chippenham and the M4 motorway became part of the extended A350.

Heading northeast, the road meets the Fosse Way near the southwestern outskirts of Cirencester. Until circa 1937 this junction was some  further south, near Jackaments Bottom; when RAF Kemble (now Cotswold Airport) was built, the A429 was diverted south of the airfield to follow an upgraded existing road through Kemble village, and the section of the A429 north of the airfield became a continuation of the A433.

The road breaks at the A46 junction north of Warwick and resumes some  further north at a junction with the A452, in the north of Kenilworth.

The section between Warwick and Kenilworth was declassified shortly after the opening of the A46 Kenilworth Bypass to encourage traffic to use the A452 or A46 instead.

See also
British road numbering scheme
A roads in Zone 4 of the Great Britain numbering scheme

References 

Roads in England
Transport in Gloucestershire
Roads in Warwickshire
Transport in Wiltshire